Morteza Ghadimipour (born 27 August 1994) is an Iranian footballer who currently plays for Parag Tehran as a goalkeeper.

Club career

Youth teams 
Ghadimipour was a member of the Esteghlal Youth Academy from 2011–2013.

Parseh Tehran 
He joined Parseh in 2013–14 season.

Persepolis 
He joined Persepolis in 2014–15 winter transfer with 2.5 years contracts. He play first game for Persepolis in Hazfi Cup.

Club career statistics
as of 6 November 2015.

CS = Clean Sheets

International career
Ghadimipour was once called up to Iran national under-17 football team's camp.

References

External links 

1994 births
Living people
Iranian footballers
People from Tehran
Association football goalkeepers
Esteghlal F.C. players
Persepolis F.C. players
Siah Jamegan players
Shamoushak Noshahr players